Eric Ng (born 27 December 1975) is a chart-topping Singaporean Mandarin pop music songwriter, music producer and music arranger, and session/touring guitarist. He is also the founder of Funkie Monkies Productions and The Songwriter Music College.

Early life 
Eric was born and raised in Singapore. At the age of 17, he started learning guitar, bass, drums and piano on his own, and started playing in bands because of his love for the band Guns ‘n’ Roses. Eric's passion and love for music has helped him gain confidence from early teens.

Career

Songwriter and Producer 
Eric's first song “Yi Ge Ren Sheng Huo 一個人生活” (by Diana Yang) was published in 1998. Within the next year, he began to publish numerous songs with Ronald Cheng, Leo Ku, Jordan Chan, Daniel Chan, Angelica Lee, Valen Hsu, Cass Phang, etc. While continue writing hit songs for top selling singers like Karen Mok, Rene Liu, and Wakin Chau, Eric also started to take on more challenges in arrangement and production.

In 2001, Eric wrote “First Class Entertainment A級娛樂” for A-mei, and “Paper Aeroplane 紙飛機” for Sandy Lam; both were incredibly successful hits, followed with “Ta Zhi De他值得” (by Victor Wong), and “Zui Hao De Shi 最好的事” (by Sandy Lam). In 2003, Eric wrote three hits for Fish Leong “For your own good 為我好”, “The Intruder 第三者”, and “I am not Afraid 我不害怕” that received great popularity. With the remarkable success of the song “Deep 無底洞” written for Tanya Chua 蔡健雅, Eric has elevated to a new career high, and was awarded with 2003 Pepsi Music Chart Best Composer. He also wrote several songs for Stefanie Sun including “Can’t be with you 不能和你一起” and “Wei Zhi De Jing Cai 未知的精采”, the theme song for FAW Group's Vizi.

In 2005, he wrote “Yi Zhuan Yi Wa 一磚一瓦”, the theme song for Hands United Program by Cathay Pacific Air and Habitat for Humanity to fundraise for the Indian Ocean tsunami victims. Eric's ability to write songs that reach and stay in the charts were repeatedly demonstrated by songs like “Invisible 隱形人” (by Stefanie Sun), and “Amphibian 雙棲動物” (by Tanya Chua), “Hostage 人質” (by Amei), etc.

Eric has become a chart-topping staple within the Asian pop scene, establishing himself as a highly acclaimed songwriter, producer and music arranger. Recognized as the launchpad for multiple hits for artists such as A-Mei, Sandy Lam, Tanya Chua, Jaycee Chan and Ming Bridges. His other work includes jingles for Samsung, Super and other brands, and performing regularly as a session guitarist for artists such as Sandy Lam and Wakin Chau, staging shows all over the world from Taiwan, Japan, Malaysia to London, America, Canada and China.

Never resting on his laurels, Eric moved into movies and musicals locally and internationally. His role as music director for Singapore hit movie <881>, composing for musicals such as Nanyang, Lao Jiu the Musical, Liao Zhai Rocks, (Singapore/Shanghai) and writing theme songs for “Voice of China - Turn you around” (China), and “Shockwave” starring Andy Lau (Hong Kong) etc. helped to elevate the value of music in these productions. The Original Soundtrack of <881> topped sales charts creating waves as the top selling movie soundtrack in Singapore history.

Music Entrepreneur 
Being the music entrepreneur, Eric founded Funkie Monkies Productions together with award-winning lyricist Xiaohan, with the vision of discovering and grooming the next generation of hit makers. As its success grew, Eric expanded Funkie Monkies to include a music publishing department, and a pop music school that also includes a production house and artist management. Starting in 2007, Funkie Monkies has been housing producers and songwriters penning hits for Stefanie Sun, Nicky Lee, Aaron Yan, etc. More than 95% of their exclusive writers were signed after attending the songwriting courses.

Currently, Funkie Monkies songwriters have had their works published by A-list Mandarin artists such as A-mei, Stefanie Sun, Jolin Tsai, Show Lo and the label has successfully launched the careers of Wu Jiahui, Serene Koong, Ming Bridges and Kenny Khoo. It is also one of the Top 6 highest grossing music publishers recognized by Warner Chappell Music, Hong Kong Limited Taiwan Branch.
Branching into formal education to train industry ready music makers, Eric further established The Songwriter Music College together with mm2 Asia for the next wave of singer songwriters and songwriter producers. The Songwriter Music College differs from Funkie Monkies in that it provides programs that offer official music diplomas.

Eric is also very involved in teaching songwriting at The Songwriter Music College and Funkie Monkies Pop Music School in hopes of helping aspiring musicians take a step closer to their dreams.

Other appearances 
Eric frequently appears on singing and songwriting competition shows as a judge, consults with brands such as Guinness on enhancing its brand image through music, and participates in global songwriting camps.

Valued for his extensive foray in the music industry, Eric has been invited to judge singing/songwriting competitions such as Academia Fantasia, Hear me Sing (StarHub) and ‘Live on’ Film competition (Ministry of Health) and to conduct music sharing seminars for institutions in Singapore (Ngee Ann, Singapore Polytechnic) and China to share his experiences in his multi-faceted music career.

With his vast artist networks and industry contacts, Eric has ventured into music consulting for brands such as Guinness, helping them enhance their brand image through advising and coordinating music events such as talent mentorship, music performances and the 1st Guinness Arthur's Day concert in Singapore, packing 7,000 enthusiastic music fans at the Max Pavilion, helping the brand win globally recognized marketing awards.

Recognizing collaboration as a crucial component in the music industry today, Eric has both organized and participated in songwriting camps in Sweden and Singapore.

The Professional Songwriting Camp (Singapore, 2016 and 2017) and the Professional Songwriting Summer Course 2018 at Musikmakarna (widely acclaimed songwriting academy in Sweden) achieved huge success in bringing new talents together to create catchy hit songs with successful placements.

As a participant, Eric was invited to international songwriting camps such as Songwriting Camps at Stockholm and The High Coast Camp in Sweden. Eric's open-minded team player personality, coupled with his exposure to multi cultures and languages growing up in Singapore, allowed him to work well with fellow industry veterans from all the world.

Works

Films and musicals involvement

Awards and nominations

Judging appearances

References

https://www.facebook.com/hyrericng
https://www.kkbox.com/tw/tc/playlist/PaeyMfwpVCjbl3brrw
https://www.facebook.com/search/top/?q=Warner%20Chappell%20Music%20Asia%20Pacific%20funkie%20monkies&epa=SEARCH_BOX
http://m.dooland.com/index.php?s=/article/id/810188.html
http://culture.zjol.com.cn/05culture/system/2007/04/06/008313100.shtml

1975 births
Living people